Podocytisus caramanicus is a species of flowering plants in the family Fabaceae. It belongs to the subfamily Faboideae. It is the only member of the genus Podocytisus.

References

Genisteae
Monotypic Fabaceae genera
Taxa named by Pierre Edmond Boissier
Taxa named by Theodor von Heldreich